The Bantu peoples, or Bantu, are an ethnolinguistic grouping of approximately 400 distinct ethnic groups who speak Bantu languages. They are native to 24 countries spread over a vast area from Central Africa to Southeast Africa and into Southern Africa. There are several hundred Bantu languages. Depending on the definition of "language" or "dialect", it is estimated that there are between 440 and 680 distinct languages. The total number of speakers is in the hundreds of millions, ranging at roughly 350 million in the mid-2010s (roughly 30% of the population of Africa, or roughly 5% of the total world population). About 60 million speakers (2015), divided into some 200 ethnic or tribal groups, are found in the Democratic Republic of the Congo alone.

The larger of the individual Bantu groups have populations of several million, e.g. the people of Rwanda and Burundi (25 million), the Bagandapeople of Uganda (10 million as of 2019), the Shona of Zimbabwe (15 million ), the Zulu of South Africa (12 million ), the Luba of the Democratic Republic of the Congo (7 million ), the Sukuma of Tanzania (9 million ), the Kikuyu of Kenya (8.1 million ), the Xhosa people of Southern Africa (8.1 million as of 2011), or the Pedi of South Africa (5.7 million as of 2017).

Etymology 

Abantu is the Zulu word for people. It is the plural of the word 'umuntu', meaning 'person', and is based on the stem '--ntu', plus the plural prefix 'aba'. In Latin, the words "Abantea", "Abanteum", and "Abanteus" have been found in ancient writings having various meanings, one of which is "an Ethiopian".

In linguistics, the word Bantu, for the language families and its speakers, is an artificial term based on the reconstructed Proto-Bantu term for "people" or "humans". It was first introduced into modern academia (as Bâ-ntu) by Wilhelm Bleek in 1857 or 1858 and popularised in his Comparative Grammar of 1862. The name was said to be coined to represent the word for "people" in loosely reconstructed Proto-Bantu, from the plural noun class prefix *ba- categorizing "people", and the root *ntʊ̀ - "some (entity), any" (e.g. Zulu  "person",  "people",  "thing",  "things").

There is no native term for the people who speak Bantu languages because they are not an ethnic group. People speaking Bantu languages refer to their languages by ethnic endonyms, which did not have an indigenous concept prior to European contact for the larger ethno-linguistic phylum named by 19th century European linguists. Bleek's coinage was inspired by the anthropological observation of groups self-identifying as "people" or "the true people". That is, idiomatically the reflexes of *bantʊ in the numerous languages often have connotations of personal character traits as encompassed under the values system of ubuntu, also known as hunhu in Chishona or botho in Sesotho, rather than just referring to all human beings.

The root in Proto-Bantu is reconstructed as *-ntʊ́. Versions of the word Bantu (that is, the root plus the class 2 noun class prefix *ba-) occur in all Bantu languages: for example, as  bantu in Kikongo and Kituba; watu in Swahili; anthu in Chichewa; batu in Lingala; bato in Kiluba; bato in Duala; abanto in Gusii; andũ in Kamba and Kikuyu; abantu in Kirundi, Lusoga, Zulu, Xhosa, Runyoro and Luganda; wandru in Shingazidja; abantru in Mpondo and Ndebele; bãthfu in Phuthi; bantfu in Swati and Bhaca; banhu in kisukuma; banu in Lala; vanhu in Shona and Tsonga; batho in Sesotho, Tswana and Northern Sotho; antu in Meru; andu in Embu; vandu in some Luhya dialects; vhathu in Venda and bhandu in Nyakyusa.

History

Origins and expansion 

Bantu languages are theorised to derive from the Proto-Bantu reconstructed language, estimated to have been spoken about 4,000 to 3,000 years ago in West/Central Africa (the area of modern-day Cameroon). They were supposedly spread across Central, East and Southern Africa in the so-called Bantu expansion, a comparatively rapid dissemination taking roughly two millennia and dozens of human generations during the 1st millennium BC and the 1st millennium AD, This concept has often been framed as a mass-migration, but Jan Vansina and others have argued that it was actually a cultural spread and not the movement of any specific populations that could be defined as an enormous group simply on the basis of common language traits.

The geographical shape and course of the Bantu expansion remains debated. Two main scenarios are proposed: an early expansion to Central Africa and a single origin of the dispersal radiating from there, or an early separation into an eastward and a southward wave of dispersal, with one wave moving across the Congo Basin toward East Africa, and another moving south along the African coast and the Congo River system toward Angola. Genetic analysis shows a significant clustered variation of genetic traits among Bantu language speakers by region, suggesting admixture from prior local populations.

According to the early-split scenario as described in the 1990s, the southward dispersal had reached the Congo rainforest by about 1500 BC and the southern savannas by 500 BC, while the eastward dispersal reached the Great Lakes by 1000 BC, expanding further from there as the rich environment supported dense populations. Possible movements by small groups to the southeast from the Great Lakes region could have been more rapid, with initial settlements widely dispersed near the coast and near rivers, because of comparatively harsh farming conditions in areas farther from water. Recent archeological and linguistic evidence about population movements suggests that pioneering groups would have had reached parts of modern KwaZulu-Natal in South Africa sometime prior to the 3rd century AD along the coast and the modern Northern Cape by AD 500.

Under the Bantu expansion migration hypothesis, various Bantu-speaking peoples would have assimilated and/or displaced many earlier inhabitants, with only a few modern peoples such as Pygmy groups in Central Africa, the Hadza people in northern Tanzania, and various Khoisan populations across southern Africa retaining autonomous existence into the era of European contact. Archeological evidence attests to their presence in areas subsequently occupied by Bantu speakers. Bantu speaking migrants would have also interacted with some Afro-Asiatic outlier groups in the southeast (mainly Cushitic), as well as Nilotic and Central Sudanic speaking groups.

Cattle terminology in use amongst the relatively few modern Bantu pastoralist groups suggests that the acquisition of cattle may have been from Central Sudanic, Kuliak and Cushitic-speaking neighbors. Linguistic evidence also indicates that the customs of milking cattle were also directly modeled from Cushitic cultures in the area. Cattle terminology in southern African Bantu languages differs from that found among more northerly Bantu speaking peoples. One recent suggestion is that Cushitic speakers had moved south earlier and interacted with the most northerly of Khoisan speakers who acquired cattle from them, and that the earliest arriving Bantu speakers in turn got their initial cattle from Cushitic influenced Khwe speaking people. Under this hypothesis, larger later Bantu speaking immigration subsequently displaced or assimilated that southernmost extension of the range of Cushitic speakers.

Later history 

Between the 9th and 15th centuries, Bantu speaking states began to emerge in the Great Lakes region and in the savanna south of the Central African rainforests. The Monomotapa kings built the Great Zimbabwe complex, a civilisation ancestral to the Shona people. Comparable sites in Southern Africa include Bumbusi in Zimbabwe and Manyikeni in Mozambique.

From the 12th century onward, the processes of state formation amongst Bantu peoples increased in frequency. This was the result of several factors such as denser population (which led to more specialized divisions of labor, including military power, while making emigration more difficult); technological developments in economic activity; and new techniques in the political-spiritual ritualization of royalty as the source of national strength and health. Examples of such Bantu states include: the Kingdom of Kongo, Anziku Kingdom, Kingdom of Ndongo, the Kingdom of Matamba the Kuba Kingdom, the Lunda Empire, the Luba Empire, Barotse Empire, Kazembe Kingdom, Mbunda Kingdom, Yeke Kingdom, Kasanje Kingdom, Empire of Kitara, Butooro, Bunyoro, Buganda, Busoga, Rwanda, Burundi, Ankole, the Kingdom of Mpororo, the Kingdom of Igara, the Kingdom of Kooki, the Kingdom of Karagwe, Swahili city states, the Mutapa Empire, the Zulu Kingdom, the Ndebele Kingdom, Mthethwa Empire, Tswana city states, Mapungubwe, Kingdom of Eswatini, the Kingdom of Butua, Maravi, Danamombe, Khami, Naletale, Kingdom of Zimbabwe   and the Rozwi Empire.

On the coastal section of East Africa, a mixed Bantu community developed through contact with Muslim Arab and Persian traders, Zanzibar being an important part in the Indian Ocean slave trade. The Swahili culture that emerged from these exchanges evinces many Arab and Islamic influences not seen in traditional Bantu culture, as do the many Afro-Arab members of the Bantu Swahili people. With its original speech community centered on the coastal parts of Zanzibar, Kenya, and Tanzania – a seaboard referred to as the Swahili Coast – the Bantu Swahili language contains many Arabic loanwords as a result of these interactions. The Bantu migrations, and centuries later the Indian Ocean slave trade, brought Bantu influence to Madagascar, the Malagasy people showing Bantu admixture, and their Malagasy language Bantu loans. Toward the 18th and 19th centuries, the flow of Zanj slaves from Southeast Africa increased with the rise of the Sultanate of Zanzibar. With the arrival of European colonialists, the Zanzibar Sultanate came into direct trade conflict and competition with Portuguese and other Europeans along the Swahili Coast, leading eventually to the fall of the Sultanate and the end of slave trading on the Swahili Coast in the mid-20th century.

List of Bantu groups by country

Use in South Africa 

In the 1920s, relatively liberal South Africans, missionaries, and the small black intelligentsia began to use the term "Bantu" in preference to "Native". After World War II, the National Party governments adopted that usage officially, while the growing African nationalist movement and its liberal allies turned to the term "African" instead, so that "Bantu" became identified with the policies of apartheid. By the 1970s this so discredited "Bantu" as an ethno-racial designation that the apartheid government switched to the term "Black" in its official racial categorizations, restricting it to Bantu-speaking Africans, at about the same time that the Black Consciousness Movement led by Steve Biko and others were defining "Black" to mean all non-European South Africans (Bantus, Khoisan, Coloureds and Indians). In modern South Africa the word's connection to apartheid has become so discredited that it is only used in its original linguistic meaning.

Examples of South African usages of "Bantu" include:

 One of South Africa's politicians of recent times, General Bantubonke Harrington Holomisa (Bantubonke is a compound noun meaning "all the people"), is known as Bantu Holomisa.
 The South African apartheid governments originally gave the name "bantustans" to the eleven rural reserve areas intended for nominal independence to deny indigenous Bantu South Africans citizenship. "Bantustan" originally reflected an analogy to the various ethnic "-stans" of Western and Central Asia. Again association with apartheid discredited the term, and the South African government shifted to the politically appealing but historically deceptive term "ethnic homelands". Meanwhile, the anti-apartheid movement persisted in calling the areas bantustans, to drive home their political illegitimacy.
 The abstract noun ubuntu, humanity or humaneness, is derived regularly from the Nguni noun stem -ntu in Xhosa, Zulu and Ndebele. In Swati the stem is -ntfu and the noun is buntfu.
 In the Sotho–Tswana languages of Southern Africa, batho is the cognate term to Nguni abantu, illustrating that such cognates need not actually look like the -ntu root exactly. The early African National Congress had a newspaper called Abantu-Batho from 1912 to 1933, which carried columns written in English, Zulu, Sotho and Xhosa.

Gallery

See also

Notes

References 
 Christopher Ehret, An African Classical Age: Eastern and Southern Africa in World History, 1000 B.C. to A.D. 400, James Currey, London, 1998
 Christopher Ehret and Merrick Posnansky, eds., The Archaeological and Linguistic Reconstruction of African History, University of California Press, Berkeley and Los Angeles, 1982
 April A. Gordon and Donald L. Gordon, Understanding Contemporary Africa, Lynne Riener, London, 1996
 John M. Janzen, Ngoma: Discourses of Healing in Central and Southern Africa, University of California Press, Berkeley and Los Angeles, 1992
 James L. Newman, The Peopling of Africa: A Geographic Interpretation, Yale University Press, New Haven, 1995. .
 Kevin Shillington, History of Africa, 3rd ed. St. Martin's Press, New York, 2005
 Jan Vansina, Paths in the Rainforest: Toward a History of Political Tradition in Equatorial Africa, University of Wisconsin Press, Madison, 1990
 Jan Vansina, "New linguistic evidence on the expansion of Bantu", Journal of African History 36:173–195, 1995

External links 

 bantu vibes—a Facebook page for Bantu people